Mysłaków may refer to the following places in Poland:
Mysłaków, Lower Silesian Voivodeship (south-west Poland)
Mysłaków, Łódź Voivodeship (central Poland)